Mary Nakhumicha Zakayo (born 19 April 1979) is a Kenyan Paralympic track athlete. She competes in the T57 class for javelin, shot put and discus throw. Her first Paralympics was 1992.

In 2008 she received the Kenyan Sports Personality of the Year Award. At the 2012 Summer Paralympics in London, she won the Whang Youn Dai Achievement Award. On accepting the award, she said, "The Paralympic Movement is spreading in my country and opens opportunities for people with disabilities and help change the perceptions towards people with disabilities in a positive way."

References

External links 
 

1979 births
Living people
Athletes (track and field) at the 2004 Summer Paralympics
Athletes (track and field) at the 2008 Summer Paralympics
Athletes (track and field) at the 2012 Summer Paralympics
Paralympic athletes of Kenya
World record holders in Paralympic athletics
Paralympic silver medalists for Kenya
Athletes (track and field) at the 1992 Summer Paralympics
Athletes (track and field) at the 1996 Summer Paralympics
Athletes (track and field) at the 2000 Summer Paralympics
Paralympic gold medalists for Kenya
Paralympic bronze medalists for Kenya
Medalists at the 2008 Summer Paralympics
Medalists at the 2000 Summer Paralympics
Medalists at the 1996 Summer Paralympics
Medalists at the 1992 Summer Paralympics
Kenyan female javelin throwers
Kenyan female shot putters
Paralympic medalists in athletics (track and field)
Wheelchair javelin throwers
Wheelchair shot putters
Paralympic javelin throwers
Paralympic shot putters